Star Reach (also spelled Star*Reach) was an  American science fiction and fantasy comics anthology published from 1974 to 1979 by Mike Friedrich.

Publication history
One of the first American mainstream independent comic books, Star*Reach bridged the gap between the countercultural underground comics and traditional Marvel/DC Comics fare, providing mature genre stories for an adult audience. The fan press of the time referred to this and the comics magazine Heavy Metal as "ground-level publications". Along with such other examples as Flo Steinberg's Big Apple Comix, published in 1975, and Harvey Pekar's naturalistic Everyman series American Splendor, first published in 1976, Star*Reach was a forerunner of the late-1970s rise of the modern graphic novel, and of the 1980s' independent comics.

Eighteen issues were released between 1974 and 1979. Contributors included such Marvel and DC writers and artists as Howard Chaykin, Jim Starlin, and Barry Windsor-Smith. It also included prose short stories by such authors as Roger Zelazny, who wrote the 13-page "The Doors of His Face, The Lamps of His Mouth", with illustrations by Gray Morrow, in issue #12 (March 1978).

Friedrich's company grew into a small publishing house in Hayward, California, also called Star*Reach, that published the comic book series Quack; Imagine; and Lee Marrs' Pudge, Girl Blimp, along with a number of one-shot comics. The company ceased publishing in 1979.

Eclipse Comics repackaged some of the original Star*Reach and Imagine material as Star*Reach Classics in 1984.

References

Sources
 Richard Arndt, Mike Friedrich, The Star Reach Companion, TwoMorrows Publishing, 2013.

External links
"The Star-Reach Bibliography", by Richard J. Arndt. WebCite archive

Comics anthologies
Defunct comics and manga publishing companies
Eclipse Comics titles
Fantasy comics
Science fiction comics
1974 comics debuts
Companies based in Hayward, California
Defunct companies based in the San Francisco Bay Area